Kerry Ann Walker  is an Australian actress. She has had a lengthy career on both stage and screen. She was nominated for the AFI Award for Best Actress in a Supporting Role three times, in 1985 for Bliss, 1986 for Twelfth Night and in 1995 for The Piano.

Walker was known for her collaboration with Australia's only recipient of the Nobel Prize in Literature, Patrick White. She appeared in the original cast of three of his plays, Signal Driver (1982), Netherwood (1983), and Shepherd on the Rocks (1987), as well as major revivals of The Ham Funeral and A Cheery Soul. Additionally, Walker played the lead role in his film The Night the Prowler (1978). White also wrote an unperformed play sequence for her, entitled Four Love Songs.

Walker was made a Member of the Order of Australia (AM) in 1994 for her "service to the performing arts".

Stuart Campbell's photographic portrait of Walker is held in the National Portrait Gallery.

References

External links
 

1948 births
Living people
Australian television actresses
Australian film actresses
Australian stage actresses
Members of the Order of Australia